Frank White (1913–1984) was an Irish hurler who played as a centre-back for the Westmeath and Dublin senior teams.

Born in Raharney, County Westmeath, White first arrived on the inter-county scene when he first linked up with the Westmeath junior team. He made his senior debut in the 1937 championship before later joining the Dublin senior team. During his career he won three Leinster medals. White was an All-Ireland runner-up on three occasions.

White also represented the Leinster inter-provincial team on a number of occasions, winning one Railway Cup medal. At club level he won two championship medals with Young Irelands after beginning his career with Raharney.

His retirement came following a defeat by Cork in the 1944 All-Ireland final.

Honours

Team

Young Irelands
Dublin Senior Hurling Championship (2): 1942, 1943

Westmeath
All-Ireland Junior Hurling Championship (1): 1936
Leinster Junior Hurling Championship (1): 1936

Kilkenny
Leinster Senior Hurling Championship (3): 1941, 1942, 1944

Leinster
Railway Cup (1): 1941

References

1913 births
1984 deaths
Raharney hurlers
Young Irelands (Dublin) hurlers
Westmeath inter-county hurlers
Dublin inter-county hurlers
Leinster inter-provincial hurlers